Nicetas was the archbishop of Aquileia from 454 to 485. In the past his life and deeds were conflated with Nicetas of Remesiana.

In 452 he temporarily moved from Aquileia to  the island of Grado, as the island was safer from attacks by groups moving west from the Eurasian Steppe into the former lands of the Roman Empire.

Saint Nicetas's feast day is observed on June 22.

References 

Bishops of Aquileia
5th-century archbishops
Year of birth unknown
Year of death unknown
5th-century Italian bishops